The September 6, 1853 cabinet, also known as the Conciliation cabinet, was a ministry of the Empire of Brazil during the reign of Emperor Pedro II. The Council of Ministers was headed by the conservative Honório Carneiro Leão, Marquis of Paraná up to his death on September 3, 1856. The Cabinet survived him under the presidency of the Duke of Caxias up to May 4, 1857.

The Cabinet
The composition of the cabinet was:

See also
History of the Empire of Brazil
Politics of the Empire of Brazil
President of the Council of Ministers of Brazil

Notes

References
 Nabuco, Joaquim. Um Estadista do Império. Volume único. 4 ed. Rio de Janeiro: Nova Aguilar, 1975. 

Political history of Brazil
1853 establishments in Brazil
Cabinets established in 1853
1857 disestablishments in Brazil
Cabinets disestablished in 1857